The Hungarian football league system is a series of connected leagues for club football in Hungary. This system has hierarchical format with promotion and relegation between leagues at different levels.

History

The governing body of football in Hungary, the Hungarian Football Federation, was founded in 1901. The five founding clubs were Budapesti TC, Magyar Úszó Egylet, Ferencvárosi TC, Műegyetemi AFC, and Budapesti SC.

Present system

References

 
Hungary